J. R. P. Suriyapperuma (born 8 June 1928) is a Sri Lankan politician, and a former  National List member of the Parliament of Sri Lanka. 

Suriyapperuma was the chief organiser of the Dedigama electorate in the Kegalle District for the Sri Lanka Freedom Party.

References

External links
Sri Lanka Parliament profile

1928 births
Living people
Sri Lankan Buddhists
Sinhalese writers
Sri Lankan non-fiction writers
Members of the 14th Parliament of Sri Lanka